Freestyle skiing at the 2023 European Youth Olympic Winter Festival was held from 22 to 27 January at Ski Area Ravascletto Zoncolan in Ravascletto, Italy. This was the first time freestyle skiing has been included in the EYOF programme.

Competition schedule

Medal summary

Boys' events

Girls' events

Medal table

References

External links
Schedule and results eyof2023.microplustimingservices.com
Official results book – Freestyle SS/BA
Official results book – Freestyle Ski Cross

European Youth Olympic Winter Festival
2023 European Youth Olympic Winter Festival events